The First Battle of Tuxpan was the only major battle fought during the Mexican–American War at Tuxpan, Mexico.

Background
Commodore Matthew C. Perry's Home Squadron extended its blockade of Mexico's eastern ports to include Tuxpan and Tabasco, more commonly known as Villahermosa. Perry's Mosquito Fleet carrying a landing force of 1,519 men and four pieces of artillery, reached the mouth of the Tuxpan River on 17 April. The Mexicans had five batteries with eight guns each, and about 400 men under the command of General Martin Perfecto de Cos, along the six mile approach to the town.

Battle
On 18 April, Perry's crafts towed 30 barges upriver, and secured two downriver fortifications and those at the edge of town by 3 PM. The town surrendered by 4 PM, when Perry removed the guns and destroyed the fortifications before evacuating the town on 22 April, keeping a pair of craft to blockade the river.

References

Further reading
 Nevin, David; editor, The Mexican War (1978)

External links
 Roll of Honor - U.S. Casualties of Naval Actions in the War with Mexico

Mosquito Fleet Campaign
United States Marine Corps in the 18th and 19th centuries
Naval battles of the Mexican–American War
April 1847 events